Mary Evelyn Rhodes (1925 – 19 February 2018) was a British author and historian, who lived in Hunstanton in the county of Norfolk. She researched and wrote a number of local history books, and is now commemorated by a plaque on the wall of the Hunstanton Heritage Centre on Northgate.

Publications
 Hunstanton Born and Bred
 Hunstanton: The First Fifty Years
 A Hunstanton Miscellany
 Hunstanton: The Great Surge of 1953

References

1925 births
2018 deaths
British women non-fiction writers
British women historians
Writers from Norfolk
People from Hunstanton